Elections to the 52nd Parliament of New South Wales were held on Saturday, 27 March 1999. All seats in the Legislative Assembly and half the seats in the Legislative Council were up for election. The Labor Party, led by premier Bob Carr won a second term with a 7% swing against the Liberal Party and National Party, led by Kerry Chikarovski.

The poll was the first to be held after two key changes to the electoral system. In 1997, the number of electoral districts was reduced from 99 to 93. In 1995, fixed four-year terms were introduced.

Background

Carr Government
The Labor Party's victory at the 1995 election was built on a number of specific promises, backed by a well directed marginal seat campaign. On taking office, the Carr Government faced difficulties presiding over a public sector that had fundamentally changed during the seven years of the Greiner and Fahey Governments. The major dynamic of the Carr Government's first term was to be the clash between the old fashioned promises that won the 1995 election and the new orthodoxy of public sector financial accountability.

This new orthodoxy had its genesis in the election of the Hawke Government at the 1983 Federal election. The new financial strictures applied by Canberra to deal with the nation's trade imbalance created problems that forced change on the States. While the term microeconomic reform was not yet in use when the Greiner Government was elected in 1988, New South Wales became the first State that committed itself to a fundamental examination of the role and activities of the public sector. Focussing initially on the efficiency of service delivery and drawing distinctions between commercial functions and core Government services, the process evolved into using market mechanisms to improve the efficiency of services for which the public sector had previously been the monopoly provider. Later, the Jeff Kennett government in Victoria and the Howard Government in Canberra were to take the process further with the wide scale use of privatisation and the outsourcing of services.

The Carr Government was always going to face problems because of the financial burden imposed by the building programme associated with the 2000 Olympics. The Government took the responsible course of choosing to fund the programme internally rather than through debt, resulting in the re-direction of Government expenditure. This approach created dilemmas with two key promises made by Labor to win the 1995 election.

The first was a promise by Carr and his Health Minister Andrew Refshauge to resign if they did not halve hospital waiting lists within twelve months. Devoting extra resources, persuading the majority of the medical profession to participate and improving hospital processes  allowed the Government to meet the commitment. The Federal government cut of funding to hospitals that followed made the waiting list numbers rise again and increased the scepticism of the public to any claim . An attempt to redistribute health infrastructure and resources by merging St Vincent's Hospital in Darlinghurst with St George Hospital in Hurstville was one of several politically damaging attempts by the Government to live within its financial means.

The second problem was a promise to abolish the tolls on the privately operated M4 and M5 motorways. Once elected, the Government announced it could not lift the tolls given the cost and contractual obligations. This was disastrous for the Government's standing, forcing it in October 1996 to announce a toll cash-back scheme for private use in an effort to recover lost support.

Dealing with state debt, building the Olympic infrastructure and meeting the cost of normal Government functions caused Cabinet to propose a radical solution in 1997: sell the State's electricity assets. The Victorian Government had raised billions in this way, and New South Wales had already divided the generating capacity into separate corporations that made privatisation possible. The policy had the additional advantage of removing the financial risk faced by the State since the introduction of a national electricity grid with full competition between suppliers. This was privatisation taken too far for the Labor Party, a State Conference refusing to sanction the sale. Finances remained tight but the Cabinet back-down solved a different problem. The Coalition was still committed to electricity privatisation, allowing the Carr Government to appeal to its own traditional base by warning the only alternative Government would be far harsher.

A redistribution was due before the 1999 election. Before starting the process, Labor number crunchers turned to deciding what number of Lower House seats delivered the best advantage for Labor. With an increase in Members ruled out by the Premier, the eventual strategy adopted was a cut to 93 MPs.

Finalised in July 1998, the new boundaries were a disappointment for the Government. Rather than strengthening Labor's hold on office, they removed the Government's majority, with only 46 of the 93 seats notionally held by Labor. The Coalition was still disadvantaged, given that it won more of the vote in 1995 and still needed a bigger swing than Labor to take office. However, the Coalition was relieved that the boundaries were considerably fairer than Labor had tried to arrange.

Ten seats were abolished and four created, another six seats adopting new names. A net four seats disappeared in Sydney and one in Newcastle. The far western seats of Broken Hill and Murray were abolished and fashioned into a new notionally National Party seat called Murray-Darling. Several Members were forced to move while three seats, Maitland, Strathfield and the new seat of Ryde, were to see contests between sitting MPs.

Retiring former Ministers caused five by-elections in May 1996, Labor receiving a bonus when former Federal MP Harry Woods won the North Coast seat of Clarence from the National Party, increasing the Government's majority to three.

Liberal Opposition
Peter Collins had taken over the Liberal leadership after the 1995 election. Although he had held several senior portfolios in the previous Government, he remained relatively unknown to the electorate. Despite the low profile of Collins, the Coalition remained competitive in opinion polls until the middle of 1998. Collins was deposed by a surprise coup in December 1998 and replaced by Kerry Chikarovski, the first woman to lead a major party in New South Wales. Less experienced at handling the media than Collins, especially television, Chikarovski struggled during the March 1999 campaign. The Coalition's campaign was also hampered by its unpopular proposal to sell the State's electricity assets. The task of selling it became more difficult when polls indicated that the promised cash rebates made voters even more suspicious of privatisation. As a result, Chikarovski bore much of the criticism of the Coalition's performance.

Results

Legislative Assembly

{{Australian elections/Title row
| table style = float:right;clear:right;margin-left:1em;
| title        = New South Wales state election, 27 March 1999
| house        = Legislative Assembly
| series       = New South Wales state election
| back         = 1995
| forward      = 2003
| enrolled     = 4,115,059  
| total_votes  = 3,832,123  
| turnout %    = 93.12%
| turnout chg  = -0.68%
| informal     = 96,000
| informal %   = 2.51%
| informal chg = -3.36%
}}

|}

{{bar box|float=right|title=Popular vote|titlebar=#ddd|width=600px|barwidth=410px|bars=

}}
The Legislative Assembly (lower house) election was a landslide. Labor's historic hold on the city of Broken Hill was maintained when Labor won Murray-Darling. Labor also won the head-to-head contests between sitting MPs in the notionally Liberal seats of Maitland, Ryde and Strathfield. Labor also gained Georges River, Menai and Miranda in southern Sydney and the far North Coast seat of Tweed. It retained Clarence and gained South Coast. Optional preferential voting was responsible for Labor holding Clarence, with the failure of Liberal voters to direct preferences denying the National candidate victory.

The two-party swing to Labor was 7.2%, winning 56.0% of the two-party preferred vote. However, Labor's primary vote had barely risen while the combined Coalition vote was down 10%. A new arrival, Pauline Hanson's One Nation Party, fresh from success at the 1998 Queensland and Federal elections, polled 7.5% of the vote. Exhausted One Nation preferences played their part in creating the swing against the Coalition. Worse for the National Party, both Dubbo and Northern Tablelands were lost to Independents, bringing to three the number of Independents in safe National Party seats.

Legislative Council

{{Australian elections/Title row
| table style = float:right;clear:right;margin-left:1em;
| title        = New South Wales state election, 27 March 1999
| house        = Legislative Council
| series       = New South Wales state election
| back         = 1995
| forward      = 2003
| staggered    = yes
| enrolled     = 4,115,059
| total_votes  = 3,832,356
| turnout %    = 93.13
| turnout chg  = –0.67
| informal     = 274,594
| informal %   = 7.17
| informal chg = +1.06
}}
	

|}This election was known derogatively as the "Tablecloth Election", due to the unprecedented number of candidates contesting the Upper House, totalling 264 candidates for 81 parties. This meant that each of the 4 million ballot papers issued measured approximately 70x100cm, the size of a small tablecloth.

The rules for nominating candidates to the Legislative Council were tightened to prevent this from happening again, as well as the abolition of group ticket preferences in response to Malcolm Jones of the Outdoor Recreation Party being elected with 0.2% of the vote.

Overview 
In the New South Wales Legislative Assembly:
the Labor Party won 55 seats
the Liberal Party won 20 seats
the National Party won 13 seats
independent candidates won 5 seats
Elections were held for half the seats in the New South Wales Legislative Council:
the Labor Party won 8 seats for a total of 16
the Liberal Party won 4 seats for a total of 10 (although Helen Sham-Ho was sitting as an independent)
the National Party won 2 seats for a total of 4
the Greens won 1 seat for a total of 2
the Christian Democratic Party won 1 seat for a total of 2
the Australian Democrats won 1 seat for a total of 2 (although Richard Jones was sitting as an independent)
 One Nation won 1 seat for a total of 1
the Unity Party won 1 seat for a total of 1
the Outdoor Recreation Party won 1 seat for a total of 1
 Reform the Legal System won 1 seat for a total of 1
the Shooters Party won 0 seats for a total of 1
 A Better Future for Our Children won 0 seats for a total of 1

Seats changing hands

 Members listed in italics did not recontest their seats.
 In addition, Labor retained the seat of Clarence, which it had gained from the National Party in the previous by-election.

Post-election pendulum

See also 
 Candidates of the 1999 New South Wales state election

References 

Psephos: Election of 27 March 1999, Legislative Assembly (Statewide summary)

New South Wales state election
Elections in New South Wales
1990s in New South Wales
New South Wales state election